A shootout which erupted during a raid between the Macedonian police and an armed group identifying itself as the National Liberation Army (NLA) occurred on 9 May 2015 in the northern Macedonian town of Kumanovo. During the shootings, eight Macedonian policemen and 10 of the militants were killed, while 37 officers were wounded and hospitalized. The shooting ended on 10 May 2015, in an operation by the Macedonian police and armed forces, in which 28 men were arrested and charged with terrorism-related charges by the Macedonian authorities.

Prelude
The event took place during a deep political crisis in the Republic of Macedonia, dating back to the 2014 general elections. The main opposition party, the Social Democratic Union of Macedonia (SDSM), has been making allegations on electoral fraud, denounced the conservative VMRO-DPMNE's party victory and has boycotted the Assembly since. Since early 2015, the Social Democratic leader, Zoran Zaev, came into possession of mass illegal wire-tap recordings allegedly orchestrated by Prime Minister Nikola Gruevski. Zaev started releasing the so-called information "bombs," a series of wire-tapped conversations between the conservative government officials, most of them including Macedonia's Prime Minister Nikola Gruevski. In doing so, he has made allegations that Gruevski has ordered the wire-tapping of some 20,000 Macedonian citizens and having control over the court system in Macedonia.

In October 2014, the building of the Macedonian government was attacked by two projectiles likely to have been fired from an RPG launcher. Around one week after the attack, a letter arrived at the Macedonian Albanian-language television station Alsat-M signed by a group claiming ties with the dissolved NLA taking responsibility for the attack. The NLA was also the main player in the 2001 insurgency in Macedonia. The document said that the Macedonian government is running a pro-Russian ideology, and that the NLA demands Macedonia join the European Union and NATO by all means.
On 21 April 2015, a police watchtower at the border between Macedonia and Kosovo, in the mountain village of Gošince, was attacked by 40 heavily armed terrorists wearing uniforms who came from Kosovo.

On 3 May 2015, the headquarters of the largest ethnic Albanian party in the Republic of Macedonia, the Democratic Union for Integration (DUI), was attacked with a hand grenade. There were no casualties, and no suspects. It was suspected that the attack was due to rising criticism of the DUI party among ethnic Albanians due to alleged close ties with the governing conservative party.

The opposition accused the government of allegedly trying to cover-up the death of a man in 2011 and a journalist in 2013, which was followed-up by violent protests against alleged police brutality on 5 May 2015. Officials said that 38 policemen were injured.

Event

Macedonian media released claims of inhabitants of Zajaz in Kumanovo that they saw around 50 armed men in the early morning. A large community of ethnic Albanians live in the region. The government issued a statement that the armed group numbered 50–70, and the armed men hid in private homes in the Kumanovo neighborhood of Divo Naselje. The armed group used automatic rifles, sniper rifles, and grenades against the police, and were said by officials to be well-trained. The Macedonian police suffered 3 dead and 12 were wounded in the morning, while unofficial sources claim over 20 wounded policemen. The inhabitants in the area were evacuated by Macedonian police during the day. Serbian media reported that a large number of Albanians from Kumanovo crossed the border into Serbia. During the clashes, the OSCE Mission to Skopje representatives were in contact with members of the armed group and representatives from the Ministry of Internal Affairs. On 14 May, US Ambassador to the OSCE, Daniel Baer thanked the OSCE Mission to Skopje for its "constructive role in facilitating a ceasefire".

Around 18:00 CET, the Macedonian media reported that the fighting had stopped, with 27 of the militants having surrendered. However, after most of them surrendered in the evening, there was still sporadic shooting. Macedonian investigators identified the militants as Macedonian and Kosovan nationals, and that they had the intention to attack government institutions and buildings. According to Albanian media NLA claims responsibility. By 10 May, the Macedonian police confirmed that the armed group had been neutralised. Eight policemen were killed..

Aftermath

After the attack, Macedonian prosecutors charged 30 militants with terrorism. Authorities said that 18 of the suspects were ethnic Albanian illegal immigrants from Kosovo. The Macedonian Ministry of Internal Affairs stated that eight police officers and 14 gunmen were killed in the operation, while 37 officers were wounded. On 10 May 2015, the Macedonian President Gjorge Ivanov called an emergency meeting of the country's National Security Council where the leadership of the Macedonian army, police, and political leaders from governing and opposition parties met in the presidential palace to discuss the events. After the meeting, Ivanov stated that "police have prevented coordinated terrorist attacks at different locations in the country that would cause serious destabilization, chaos and fear," adding that the authorities were aware of the armed group's activities since "early 2015." The Macedonian government declared two national days of mourning after the attacks for the police officers that lost their lives during the attack.

Official statements 

In his speech, the Macedonian Prime Minister Gruevski, praised the police operation calling it a "highly professional, heroic and patriotic action," adding that the "group planned to attack sports events, shopping malls, as well as state-run institutions." He also hailed the eight Macedonian policemen that died during the raid, but also claimed that "their courage may have prevented the killing of some other 8,000 people." Gruevski, during his televised address, said "this is not a Macedonian-Albanian conflict, but a conflict between people who mean no good to the state and people who uphold the state."

President Ivanov said that the Macedonian authorities were aware of the presence of the terrorist group within the country since the beginning of 2015. During his speech at the National Security Council he added that he had informed representatives from the European Union and NATO about the existence of the militant group, without "much results" from the organisations. He also stated that "at the meeting of the National Security Council, which was attended by representatives of the opposition, the attack on the security of the country, whose aim was to destabilise Macedonia, was condemned in the strongest terms," pointing out that "it is high time that those conversations intensified" on the matter of Macedonia joining the European Union and NATO.

Allegations

The clashes occurred shortly after the release of audio surveillance revealing corruption on a massive scale committed by the leading party in government. Many opposition leaders and political experts claim the shootout was politically set-up in order to divert the public's attention away from the scandals revolving around the corruption allegations. They also claim there is evidence that the group was paid 2 million euros in order to carry out the clashes. Due to how sensitive and controversial this event was, Prime Minister Zoran Zaev declared there will be an international probe.

International reaction
 - Albanian Foreign Minister Ditmir Bushati called for an international investigation into the shooting. He stated that the Ohrid Agreement and its implementation represent "the basis for the democratic stability and Euro-Atlantic future of Macedonia" and that "democratic rights in Macedonia should be respected." Albanian Prime Minister Edi Rama also reacted to what had happened in Kumanovo, and while he was attending a ministerial meeting he stated that his country would veto Macedonia's NATO candidacy if it did not respect the rights of its ethnic Albanian minority.
 - Bulgarian prime minister Boyko Borisov, on 13 May 2015, told the country's parliament that he has sent Bulgarian Army troops to the border with Macedonia in order to stop a possible influx of refugees into the country and to prepare to stop potential terrorist attacks.
 - The EU's commissioner for negotiations on enlargement and neighborhood policy, Johannes Hahn, sent three messages about the attacks in Kumanovo, writing "we call on all concerned parties and stakeholders to cooperate in clarifying what happened, who was in charge and who is responsible for it and to act united on this issue." He also stated that he urges "the authorities and all political and community leaders to cooperate, to restore calm and fully investigate the events in an objective and transparent manner within the Law."
 - Greek Foreign Minister Nikos Kotzias met with his Macedonian counterpart Nikola Poposki in Antalya on 13 May, on the side of a NATO Foreign Ministers meeting. He offered Greece's condolences to the families of the victims.
 - The Ministry of Foreign Affairs of Kosovo released a statement condemning the violence and called for respect for the Ohrid Agreement of 2001. In a meeting with the Macedonian ambassador to Kosovo, Deputy Minister of Foreign Affairs Petrit Selimi promised that Kosovo would intensify co-operation with Macedonian authorities and agreed to share information on suspected culprits.
 - NATO Secretary General, Jens Stoltenberg, at a press conference at the NATO headquarters in Brussels stated "Macedonian police was ready to handle the situation, but unfortunately with lost [sic]," adding "I urge everyone to exercise restraint and avoid any further escalation, in the interest of the country and the whole region." His official written statement reads that "it is important that all political and community leaders work together to restore calm and conduct a transparent investigation to establish what happened."
 - A statement from the Russian Foreign Ministry stated that it supported the conservative government of Nikola Gruevski, stating that "the eruption of anti-government activities in Macedonia over the last days is worrying," later pointing that "the choice of many opposition movements and NGOs, inspired by the West, that favour the logic of the street and the known scenario of a 'colored revolution', is full of dangerous consequences."    
 - The Serbian President Tomislav Nikolić, sent a letter of condolences for the events in Kumanovo to Macedonia's president, saying he is "deeply distressed at the news about the bloodshed in Kumanovo caused by fanatic terrorist actions." Also, the Serbian prime minister Aleksandar Vučić sent a telegram to Gruevski, stating "on the behalf of the Serbian government and on my personal behalf, I would like to extend sincere condolences to you and the families of the victims." The chief of the Serbian Military Intelligence Agency claimed that he warned Macedonian colleagues about sudden attacks, but Macedonian intelligence officers believed that the statements were over exaggerated.
 - The Ministry of Foreign Affairs released hopes that the political tensions which have been ongoing in the Republic of Macedonia for a certain period of time would be resolved through democratic means within the principle of rule of law, and dialogue, and the domestic peace and inter-ethnic balance achieved through the Ohrid Framework Agreement in 2001 will not be damaged.

See also

Gosince attack
2001 insurgency in the Republic of Macedonia
Timeline of Kumanovo
2015 Macedonian protests

Annotations

References 

Albanian nationalism in North Macedonia
Attacks in Europe in 2015
Conflicts in 2015
Terrorist incidents in Europe in 2015
2015 in the Republic of Macedonia
Terrorism in North Macedonia
Kumanovo
Nationalist terrorism in Europe
Albanian separatism
Law enforcement in North Macedonia
Modern history of North Macedonia